The Constitution of Bosnia and Herzegovina (Bosnian, Croatian and Serbian: Ustav Bosne i Hercegovine / Устав Босне и Херцеговине) is the highest legal document of Bosnia and Herzegovina. The current Constitution is the Annex 4 of The General Framework Agreement for Peace in Bosnia and Herzegovina, also known as the Dayton Agreement, signed on 14 December 1995. The Constitution saw the end of war in Bosnia and Herzegovina, however it has seen a large amount of criticism. Under the supervision of international community, an "arrangement of amendments" (later called "April arrangement of amendments") to the Constitution, agreed upon by leading political parties, was proposed for adoption in the Parliamentary Assembly of Bosnia and Herzegovina in April 2006, but it failed to get the approval of two-thirds of members in the House of Representatives.

In five cases since 2009, the European Court of Human Rights has determined that the constitution discriminates against Jews, Roma, and other Bosnian citizens who are not Croat, Serb, or Bosniak for running for president. The constitution has yet to be amended.

Nature of the Constitution

The Constitution of Bosnia and Herzegovina is the constitution in international contractual form, since it is an integral part of a larger peace agreement signed by Alija Izetbegović, Franjo Tuđman and Slobodan Milošević, three presidents of countries involved in war in Bosnia and Herzegovina, as well as the representatives of European Union (Felipe González), United States (Bill Clinton), Germany (Helmut Kohl), United Kingdom (John Major), France (Jacques Chirac) and Russia (Viktor Chernomyrdin). This nature of the Constitution was also of vital importance for the Constitutional Court of Bosnia and Herzegovina, in its landmark decision on constituency of peoples (U-5/98), since it declared that the Constitution could be interpreted as a treaty defined in Vienna Convention on the Law of Treaties from 1969, which was of great importance in the interpretation of the Preamble of the Constitution.

Preamble

The Preamble states, among other things, the commitment of Bosnia and Herzegovina to freedom, equality, tolerance and democratic institutions of government. It also states that the carriers of sovereignty are "constituent peoples" (Bosniaks, Croats and Serbs), along with "Others" and "citizens of Bosnia and Herzegovina", which has also seen a great amount of debate between legal scholars over an apparent contradiction.

Articles

Article I - on Bosnia and Herzegovina: Continuation, Democratic Principles, Composition, Movement of Goods, Capital, Symbols and Citizenship 
Article II - on Human Rights and Fundamental Freedoms: Human Rights, International Standards, Enumeration of Rights, Non-Discrimination, Refugees and Displaced Persons, Implementation, International Agreements and Cooperation
Article III - on Responsibilities of and Relations Between the Institutions of Bosnia and Herzegovina and the Entities: Responsibilities of the Institutions of Bosnia and Herzegovina, Responsibilities of the Entities, Law and Responsibilities of the Entities and the Institutions, Coordination and Additional Responsibilities 
Article IV - on Parliamentary Assembly: House of Peoples, House of Representatives, Procedures and Powers
Article V - on Presidency: Election and Term, Procedures, Powers, Council of Ministers and Standing Committee
Article VI - on Constitutional Court: Composition, Procedures, Jurisdiction and Decisions
Article VII - on Central Bank 
Article VIII - on Finances
Article IX - on General Provisions
Article X - on Amendment Procedure
Article XI - on Transitional Arrangements
Article XII - on Entry into Force

Annexes

Annex I - on Additional Human Rights Agreements To Be Applied In Bosnia And Herzegovina
1. 1948 Convention on the Prevention and Punishment of the Crime of Genocide 
2. 1949 Geneva Conventions I-IV on the Protection of the Victims of War, and the 1977 Geneva Protocols I-II thereto 
3. 1951 Convention relating to the Status of Refugees and the 1966 Protocol thereto 
4. 1957 Convention on the Nationality of Married Women 
5. 1961 Convention on the Reduction of Statelessness 
6. 1965 International Convention on the Elimination of All Forms of Racial Discrimination 
7. 1966 International Covenant on Civil and Political Rights and the 1966 and 1989 Optional Protocols thereto 
8. 1966 Covenant on Economic, Social and Cultural Rights 
9. 1979 Convention on the Elimination of All Forms of Discrimination against Women 
10. 1984 Convention against Torture and Other Cruel, Inhuman or Degrading Treatment or Punishment 
11. 1987 European Convention on the Prevention of Torture and Inhuman or Degrading Treatment or Punishment 
12. 1989 Convention on the Rights of the Child
13. 1990 International Convention on the Protection of the Rights of All Migrant Workers and Members of Their Families 
14. 1992 European Charter for Regional or Minority Languages 
15. 1994 Framework Convention for the Protection of National Minorities

The Convention for the Protection of Human Rights and Fundamental Freedoms of 1950 (European Convention on Human Rights), although not noted here, is a part of the Constitution (Article II, 2).

Annex II - on Transitional Arrangements: Joint Interim Commission, Continuation of Laws, Judicial and Administrative Proceedings, Offices and Treaties

Protection of Human Rights and Fundamental Freedoms

Besides the provisions stated in the Preamble, the Constitution (Article II) protects the human rights and fundamental freedoms by defining them through "Enumeration of Rights" (Article II, 3.), stating that the enjoyment of the rights and freedoms is secured to all persons in Bosnia and Herzegovina without discrimination on any grounds ("Non-Discrimination", Article II, 4.) and by giving the supremacy of The Convention for the Protection of Human Rights and Fundamental Freedoms over all other law in Bosnia and Herzegovina. Also, the Constitution states that Bosnia and Herzegovina "shall remain or become party to the international agreements listed in Annex I to this Constitution" (Article II, 7.), and in all there are fifteen of these international agreements. The Constitution also states that no amendment to the Constitution can eliminate or diminish any of the rights and freedoms referred to in Article II of the Constitution (Article X, 2.).

The Constitutional Court of Bosnia and Herzegovina has made several notable decisions in the interpretation of these provisions, with most important being the "Decision on the Constituency of Peoples" (U-5/98). Still there are great criticisms of the Constitution, stating that it is of discriminatory nature, since in many of its articles it discriminates against citizens that are not from "constituent peoples", such as the Article V which sets out the rules for the election of the Presidency of Bosnia and Herzegovina. There has been an attempt to challenge the Electoral law, which has the basis in the Constitution, which is seen as being discriminatory to "Others", as well as to "constituent peoples" to some degree, by trying to interpret the Article II(2) in a way that the European Convention for the Protection of Human Rights and Fundamental Freedoms and its Protocols have the supremacy over the Constitution of Bosnia and Herzegovina itself. However, the Constitutional Court of Bosnia and Herzegovina declined this position in its decision number U-5/04. This has led Jakob Finci, the leader of Jewish community in Bosnia and Herzegovina, to file a suit against Bosnia and Herzegovina in front of European Court of Human Rights, which acknowledged his ineligibility for Presidency and House of Peoples to be in violation of the European Convention on Human Rights.

Constitutional Court of Bosnia and Herzegovina

The Constitutional Court of Bosnia and Herzegovina is a special court sui generis, whose main role is to be the interpreter and guardian of the Constitution of Bosnia and Herzegovina, as stated in Article VI, paragraph 3 of the Constitution ("The Constitutional Court shall uphold this Constitution"), and it is considered to be the highest judicial authority, since it has the appellate jurisdiction over issues under the Constitution arising out of a judgement of any other court in Bosnia and Herzegovina (Article VI, paragraph 3.b).

Amendment procedure

In the Article X, defining the amendment procedure, the Constitution states that it can be amended by a decision of the Parliamentary Assembly, including a two-thirds majority of those present and voting in the House of Representatives. The Constitution does not say who has the right, and under what rules, to present the amendments to the Parliamentary Assembly. Also, in the paragraph 2 of the Article X, the Constitution states that the rights and freedoms, as seen in the Article II, cannot be derogated, as well as the paragraph 2 itself.

Compliance with the European Convention of Human Rights and Constitutional reform attempts

In 2009, the European Court of Human Rights ruled in Sejdić and Finci v. Bosnia and Herzegovina, a case filed by Dervo Sejdic and Jakob Finci, two Bosnian citizens of Romani and Jewish ethnicity, and are therefore ineligible for running for president. The court determined that this restriction (an estimated 400,000 Bosnian citizens, 12 per cent of the population, cannot run for president due to their religion, ethnicity, or place of residence) violates the European Convention of Human Rights. Four subsequent cases also found that the constitution is discriminatory. However, as of 2020 it has yet to be amended.

References

The Constitution of Bosnia and Herzegovina

External links

 
Law of Bosnia and Herzegovina